Gyrpanetes is a genus of longhorn beetles of the subfamily Lamiinae, containing the following species:

 Gyrpanetes cacapira Martins & Galileo, 1998
Gyrpanetes clarkei Martins, Galileo & Santos-Silva, 2015
 Gyrpanetes oriba Galileo & Martins, 2003
 Gyrpanetes pukuaba  Martins & Galileo, 1998

References

Desmiphorini